In mathematics, an algebraic geometric code (AG-code), otherwise known as a Goppa code, is a general type of linear code constructed by using an algebraic curve  over a finite field . Such codes were introduced by Valerii Denisovich Goppa. In particular cases, they can have interesting extremal properties, making them useful for a variety of error detection and correction problems.

They should not be confused with binary Goppa codes that are used, for instance, in the McEliece cryptosystem.

Construction

Traditionally, an AG-code is constructed from a non-singular projective curve X over a finite field  by using a number of fixed distinct -rational points on :

By the Riemann–Roch theorem, there is a unique finite-dimensional vector space, with respect to the divisor . The vector space is a subspace of the function field of X.

There are two main types of AG-codes that can be constructed using the above information.

Function code 
The function code (or dual code) with respect to a curve X, a divisor  and the set  is constructed as follows.

Let , be a divisor, with the   defined as above. We usually denote a Goppa code by C(D,G). We now know all we need to define the Goppa code:

Therefore,

 

is a generator matrix for 

Equivalently, it is defined as the image of

The following shows how the parameters of the code relate to classical parameters of linear systems of divisors D on C (cf. Riemann–Roch theorem for more). The notation ℓ(D) means the dimension of L(D).

Proposition A. The dimension of the Goppa code  is 

Proof. Since  we must show that

Let  then  so . Thus,  Conversely, suppose  then  since

It follows that 

Proposition B. The minimal distance between two code words is 

Proof. That means that for  indices  we have for  Then , and

Taking degrees on both sides and noting that

we get

so

Residue code 
The residue code can be defined as the dual of the function code, or as the residue of some functions at the 's.

References 

 Key One Chung, Goppa Codes, December 2004, Department of Mathematics, Iowa State University.

External links
 An undergraduate thesis on Algebraic Geometric Coding Theory
 Goppa Codes by Key One Chung

Coding theory
Algebraic curves
Finite fields
Articles containing proofs